Buckles was an unincorporated community in Lee County, Virginia, United States.

A post office was established at Buckles in 1922, and closed in 1934.

References

Unincorporated communities in Lee County, Virginia
Unincorporated communities in Virginia